New Siem Reap-Angkor International Airport (Khmer: អាកាសយានដ្ឋានអន្តរជាតិសៀមរាប-អង្គរថ្មី។, French: Nouvel Aéroport International de Siem Reap-Angkor) , is an under-construction international airport, which will serve Siem Reap, Cambodia. It will replace the existing Siem Reap International Airport as the city’s main airport, and will serve as a main airport for the province as well as for Western Cambodia. It will also become the largest airport in Cambodia. Construction started in July 2018 and was expected to be completed in 2021/22, but due to the COVID-19 pandemic and lack of labour and restrictions, it caused delays in work. The airport is now expected to be completed by March 2023 and scheduled to be opened in October 2023.

History
Due to growing demands and traffic, the existing Siem Reap International Airport will not be able to cope in the future, as it is already running in its constraining capacity of over 10 million passengers per annum. So, to handle the future traffic, the Government of Cambodia decided to build a new airport for Siem Reap and eventually replace the present airport with the new one in the future. The project was first introduced in 2010, and selected a Chinese company, Yunnan Investment Holdings Limited, to build the airport in December 2016.

Another reason for the project is because of a study conducted by a team of researchers, who found that due to the existing airport and the city's excessive air pollution, the harmful pollutants present in the air is causing harm to the Angkor Wat Temple Complex. If remained unchecked, it can result in the complete erasing of scriptures and carvings and damage to the entire complex.

Features
The airport is being built in three phases, at a cost of US$880 million and at an area of 750 hectares, The airport will have a passenger terminal equipped with 15 aerobridges, a cargo terminal, an Air Traffic Control ATC Tower, a 3,600 metre runway with a parallel taxiway connecting to it among other ancillary facilities. The terminal will be able to handle 5–7 million passengers per year in the first phase.

The airport's runway will be capable of handling aircraft like the Boeing 737 and Airbus A320, while in the second phase, the runway will be expanded to handle widebody aircraft like the Boeing 777, Boeing 787, Airbus A350 and Airbus A330, which will increase the airport's capacity to 10 million passengers per year, by 2030, and finally in the third phase, the total capacity will increase to over 20 million passengers per year, by 2050. The airport will be connected with an airport expressway directly from the city.

Status updates
The airport has been upgraded as follows:
 September 2010: Council for the Development of Cambodia has approved plans for the construction of a new US$1 billion international airport in Siem Reap. The project still awaits final approval from the then Prime Minister of Cambodia, Hun Sen. The investment will come from NSIA Company, a new joint venture owned by Camco Airport Company and Lees A&A Company.
 March 2011: The NSIA Company is working on the project for the construction of a new international airport 40 km east of Angkor Wat, at a cost of US$500 million. The airport will have one runway and a terminal on a site as large as 5 sq.km., and the ability to handle 3 million passengers per year. The new airport is expected to commence operation in late-2015 when the existing airport will be closed.
August 2016: The then Minister of Public Works and Transport, Sun Chanthol, stated the government is seeking Chinese investment to construct a new airport and an expressway.
December 2016: The Cambodian Government decided to reassign a US$88 million contract to develop  the airport 50 km outside of Siem Reap from Cambodia Airports to Yunnan Investment Holdings Ltd (YIHL). The government is required to compensate Cambodia Airports for ending its concession prematurely. A committee was formed, headed by the then Cambodia Senior Minister, Yim Nola, to negotiate with Cambodia Airports the terms and value for compensation which will be paid by YIHL.
February 2017: Cambodia State Secretariat of Civil Aviation (SSCA) received the full proposal for Siem Reap New International Airport development project from awarded contractor Yunnan Investment Holdings Ltd. The then Provincial governor, Kim Bunsong, said the new infrastructure will have capacity for 10 million passengers per year, but the development cost remains unconfirmed. Construction is scheduled to commence in late 2017 or early 2018 and is expected to last up to five years.
August 2017: The Cambodian Government signed a US$880 million contract with YIHL to develop the airport. Land clearance were started, with construction scheduled to commence  from 2018.
August 2017: YIHL decided to begin construction in 2018. The airport will be constructed in three phases over a three year period.
July 2018: The Vice-President of YIHL, Zou Yuhui, declared that the company has started construction the new airport. YIHL plans to develop the airport in three stages, with the airport capable of handling Boeing 737 and Airbus A320 aircraft, following completion of the second stage.
May 2020: Cambodia's State Secretariat for Civil Aviation Secretary, Mao Havannall, reported the airport is due to be completed by 14 March 2023. The US$880 million airport project, which commenced in Mar-2020, will span 700 hectares and is set to be the largest airport in Cambodia. It will be operated by Angkor International Airport Investment, a JV between three Yunnan-based companies including YIHL, which signed a 55- year concession with Cambodia's Government in 2017. The Shanxi Mechanisation Construction Group also won a bid to build two sections of the new airport for US$42.2 million in 2018. Once completed, it will be able to accommodate up to seven million passengers per year.
April 2022: Cambodia's State Secretariat of Civil Aviation (SSCA) spokesman, Sin Chansereyvutha, reported approximately 22% of construction activities at the airport have been completed. These include roads, aircraft parking routes, runways and aircraft landing systems. He also said that around 20% of terminal infrastructure has been completed.
October 2022: Cambodia's Minister Delegate to the Prime Minister, Tek Reth Samrech, stated construction of the airport will be 70% completed by the end of 2022. Construction will be completed by March 2023 and operations are due to launch from October 2023.

See also
Siem Reap International Airport
List of airports in Cambodia

References

Airports in Cambodia